You're Gonna Get It! is the second album by Tom Petty and the Heartbreakers, released in 1978. Design and art direction Kosh. Originally, the album was to be titled Terminal Romance. It peaked at No. 23 on the Billboard Top LPs & Tapes chart in 1978.

Critical reception

Many reviewers rated You're Gonna Get It! a notch lower than the band's moderately well-received debut album. Some reviews such as in Rolling Stone at the time noted the "impressive stylistic cohesiveness" between the two.  It did chart higher, however, than its predecessor.

Track listing

Charts

Certifications

Personnel 
Tom Petty & the Heartbreakers

Tom Petty  – electric guitar, acoustic guitar, twelve-string guitar, rhythm guitar, piano, vocals
Mike Campbell  – electric guitar, acoustic guitar, twelve string guitar, lead guitar, accordion
Benmont Tench – piano, Hammond organ, keyboards, backing vocals
Ron Blair – bass guitar, acoustic guitar, sound effects, backing vocals
Stan Lynch  – drums, backing vocals

Additional musicians
Phil Seymour  – backing vocals on "Magnolia"
Noah Shark – percussion

Production

 Denny Cordell – producer
 Tom Petty – producer
 Max Reese – engineer
 Noah Shark – producer, engineer

References

1978 albums
Tom Petty albums
Albums produced by Denny Cordell
Albums produced by Tom Petty
Shelter Records albums